Southwest Friesland is a municipality in the Northern Netherlands, located in the province of Friesland. It had a population of 84,092 in August 2017. Sneek is the municipal seat. With a total area of 841.56 km2, Súdwest-Fryslân is the largest municipality by area in the Netherlands.

History
Súdwest-Fryslân was formed in 2011 from the old municipalities of Bolsward, Nijefurd, Sneek, Wûnseradiel and Wymbritseradiel. In 2014 it was enlarged by parts of the former municipality of Boarnsterhim. On 1 January 2018 it was enlarged by parts of former municipality of Littenseradiel.

Geography

The municipality is formed by several settlements, divided into towns and villages.

Towns
The towns located in Súdwest-Fryslân are Bolsward, Hindeloopen, IJlst, Sneek, Stavoren and Workum.

Villages
The villages located in Súdwest-Fryslân are Abbegea, Allingawier, Arum, Blauwhuis, Bozum, Breezanddijk, Britswerd, Burgwerd, Cornwerd, Dedgum, Easterein, Edens, Exmorra, Ferwoude, Folsgare, Gaast, Gaastmeer, Gauw, Goënga, Greonterp, Hartwerd, Heeg, Hemelum, Hennaard, Hichtum, Hidaard, Hieslum, Hommerts, Idsegahuizum, Idzega, Indijk, It Heidenskip, Itens, Jutrijp, Kimswerd, Kornwerderzand, Koudum, Koufurderrige, Kubaard, Laaxum, Loënga, Lollum, Longerhouw, Lutkewierum, Makkum, Molkwerum, Nijhuizum, Nijland, Offingawier, Oosterend, Oosterwierum, Oosthem, Oppenhuizen, Oudega, Parrega, Piaam, Pingjum, Poppenwier, Raerd, Rien, Roodhuis, Sandfirden, Scharl, Scharnegoutum, Schettens, Schraard, Sibrandabuorren, Smallebrugge, Tirns, Tjalhuizum, Tjerkwerd, Uitwellingerga, Waaxens, Warns, Westhem, Wieuwerd, Witmarsum, Wolsum, Wommels, Wons, Woudsend, Ypecolsga, Ysbrechtum and Zurich.

Hamlets
The Hamlets located in Súdwest-Fryslân are Aaksens, Abbegaasterketting, Abbegaasterrige, Andelahuizen, Angterp, Annabuorren, Arkum, Atzeburen, Baarderbuorren, Baburen, Barnsterbuorren, Barsum, Bessens, Bittens, Bloemkamp, Bonjeterp, Bootland, Bovenburen, De Band, De Bieren, De Blokken, De Burd, De Hel, De Grits, De Kat, De Kliuw, De Nes, De Pôle, De Weeren, De Wieren, Dijksterburen, Doniaburen, Doniawier, Draaisterhuzen, Easthim, Eemswoude, Engwier, Exmorrazijl, Feytebuorren, Fiifhûs, Fiskersbuorren, Flansum, Galamadammen, Goëngamieden, Gooium, Grauwe Kat, Greate Wierrum, Grote Wiske, Harkezijl, Hayum, Hemert, Hiddum, Hidaardersyl, Hoekens, Hornsterburen, Houw, Idserdaburen, Ingwert, It Fliet, Jeth, Jonkershuizen, Jousterp, Jouswerd, Kampen, Klaeiterp, Kleine Wiske, Knossens, Kooihuizen, Koudehuizum, Kromwâl, Laad en Zaad, Lippenwâlde, Littenserbuorren, Lytse Gaastmar, Lytshuzen, Makkum, Boazum, Meilahuzen, Monsamabuorren, Nijbuorren, Nijekleaster, Nijezijl, Osingahuizen, Ottenburen, Pikesyl, Rea Skuorre, Remswerd, Rytseterp, Sandfirderrijp, Scharneburen, Sieswerd, Sjungadijk, Skrok, Sotterum, Spears, Spreeuwenstein, Spyk, Strand, Swaenwert, Swarte Beien, Trijehuzen, Tsjerkebuorren, Vierhuizen, Viersprong, Wolsumerketting, Wonneburen and Yndyk.

Politics
The college van burgemeester en wethouders of Súdwest-Fryslân consists of Mayor Haijo Apotheker and aldermen A. Offinga, G. Akkerman-Wielinga, W. Sinnema, A. Ekhart and L. P. Stoel.

Notable people 

 Pier Gerlofs Donia (ca.1480 in Kimswerd – 1520) a Frisian rebel leader and pirate
 Menno Simons (1496 in Witmarsum – 1561) a Roman Catholic priest, an influential Anabaptist religious leader, his followers became known as Mennonites
 brothers Boetius à Bolswert (ca.1585 in Bolsward – 1633) and Schelte a Bolswert (1586 in Bolsward – 1659) were copper-plate engravers 
 Gysbert Japiks (1603 in Bolsward – 1666) a West Frisian writer, poet, schoolmaster and cantor
 Allart Pieter van Jongestall (1612 in Stavoren – 1676) a Dutch jurist and diplomat
 Jacob Potma (ca.1630 in Workum – 1704) a Dutch Golden Age painter
 Jacob Binckes (1637 in Koudum – 1677) a Dutch commodore
 Lambert Bos (1670 in Workum – 1717) a Dutch scholar and critic
 Eelco Alta (1723 in Makkum - 1798) a Frisian clergyman, theologian and veterinarian
 Cynthia Lenige (1755 in Makkum – 1780) a Frisian poet
 Douwe de Hoop (1800 in Workum - 1830) a Dutch painter and draftsman
 Sgnt James H. Burbank (1838 in Stavoren – 1911) a soldier, awarded the US Medal of Honor 
 Hobbe Smith (1862 in Witmarsum – 1942) a Dutch painter in the Post-Impressionist style
 B.D. Dykstra (1871 in Pingjum - 1955) a Dutch American pastor, educator and poet
 Willem de Sitter (1872 in Sneek – 1934) a Dutch mathematician, physicist and astronomer
 Pieter Sjoerds Gerbrandy (1885 in Goënga – 1961) a Dutch politician and Prime Minister of the Netherlands from 1940 to 1945
 Hilbrand Boschma (1893 in Ysbrechtum – 1976) a Dutch zoologist and director of the Rijksmuseum of Natural History 
 Hans Wiegel (born 1941) a retired Dutch politician and businessman, lives in Oudega 
 Klaas Rusticus (born 1942 in Sneek) a Dutch author and TV and film director
 Hillie Molenaar (born 1945 in Sneek) a Dutch documentary film director
 Jan de Haan (born 1951 in Warns) a contemporary Dutch composer, conductor and musician
 Liuwe Tamminga (1953 in Hemelum – 2021) a Dutch organist and harpsichordist, played Italian Early Music
 Pauline Krikke (born 1961 in Sneek) a Dutch politician and Mayor of The Hague 2017/2019

Sport 

 Pim Mulier (1865 in Witmarsum – 1954) introduced tennis, athletics, cricket and hockey to the Netherlands
 Jan Ankerman (1906 in Wommels – 1942) a Dutch field hockey player who competed in the 1928 Summer Olympics
 Wout Zijlstra (born 1964 in Wolsum) a former strongman and Highland Games athlete
 twin brothers Ben & Jan Kouwenhoven (born 1965 in Sneek) sailors, who competed at the 1992 Summer Olympics
 Ronald Zoodsma (born 1966 in Sneek) a retired volleyball player, team silver medallist at the 1992 Summer Olympics
 brothers Gerhard (1967 in Sneek – 2006)  & Willem Potma (born 1969 in Sneek) sailors, who competed at the 1992 and 1996 Summer Olympics
 Pieter Huistra (born 1967 in Goënga) a Dutch former football winger with 394 club caps 
 Olof van der Meulen (born 1968 in Sneek) a retired volleyball player and team silver and gold medallist at the 1992 and 1996 Summer Olympics 
 Rick Hofstra (born 1977 in Sneek) a Dutch professional darts player
 Sandor van der Heide (born 1978 in Ysbrechtum) a football manager and former player with 282 club caps
 Loes Geurts (born 1986 in Wûnseradiel) a Dutch footballer goalkeeper, over 100 caps for the Netherlands women's national football team
 Sherida Spitse (born 1990 in Sneek) a Dutch football midfielder with over 250 club caps and 175 international caps
 Nyck de Vries (born 1995 in Sneek) is a Dutch Formula E racing driver
 Liesette Bruinsma (born 2000) a Dutch Paralympic swimmer, lives in Wommels

References

External links

Official website

 
Municipalities of Friesland
Municipalities of the Netherlands established in 2011